Amblyseius franzellus is a species of mite in the family Phytoseiidae.

References

franzellus
Articles created by Qbugbot
Animals described in 1967